Songlin may refer to:

Songrim, a city in North Hwanghae Province, North Korea
Songlin language, an unclassified Sino-Tibetan language of Zayu County, Tibet, China